Luis Fernando Machado Pinto (born September 26, 1979) is an Uruguayan retired footballer. He is currently the assistant manager of Talleres.

Career
Machado played for 11 clubs in 5 different countries along his football career. His former teams include Montevideo Wanderers, Nacional, Cerrito and Fénix de Montevideo in his home country, Asteras Tripolis and Levadiakos F.C. from Greece, Pumas UNAM, Atlético Celaya and San Luis F.C. in Mexico, Gimnasia de Jujuy in the Argentine Primera División, as well as Bolivian side Blooming.

Coaching career
In July 2016 it was announced, that Machado had decided to retire. He began his coaching career at his former club, Club Nacional de Football, as assistant manager of the club's reserve team with his former teammate, Alexander Medina, as manager. In December 2017 it was confirmed, that the duo would take charge of the club's first team. They left the club at the end of the year.

In June 2019 it was confirmed, that Medina had become manager of Talleres, once again with Machado as his assistant.

References

External links
 
 Player Details

Living people
1979 births
Uruguayan footballers
Uruguayan expatriate footballers
Uruguay under-20 international footballers
Uruguayan Primera División players
Argentine Primera División players
Super League Greece players
Liga MX players
Montevideo Wanderers F.C. players
Club Nacional de Football players
Sportivo Cerrito players
Club Universidad Nacional footballers
Atlético Celaya footballers
San Luis F.C. players
Levadiakos F.C. players
Asteras Tripolis F.C. players
Gimnasia y Esgrima de Jujuy footballers
Club Blooming players
Centro Atlético Fénix players
Juventud de Las Piedras players
Expatriate footballers in Greece
Expatriate footballers in Mexico
Expatriate footballers in Argentina
Expatriate footballers in Bolivia
Association football defenders